Asadollah Mikaeili, better known as Dariush Mikaeili is an Iranian footballer who plays for Naft Tehran F.C. in the Iranian Premier League.

Club career
Mikaeli moved to Naft Tehran F.C. in 2009 after spending the previous season with Shirin Faraz of the Azadegan League.

References

Living people
Iranian footballers
Shirin Faraz Kermanshah players
Naft Tehran F.C. players
Persian Gulf Pro League players
Azadegan League players
Association football midfielders
Year of birth missing (living people)
21st-century Iranian people